The 2020 PDC Unicorn Challenge Tour were a series of events that were part of the 2020 PDC Pro Tour.

Having originally been scheduled to increase from 20 events to 24, following the COVID-19 pandemic, the tour was reduced to just 10 events in 2020.

The top 2 players on the rankings would earn a PDC Tour Card and qualify for the 2021 PDC World Darts Championship.

Prize money
The prize money for the Challenge Tour events remained the same from 2019, with each event having a prize fund of £10,000.

This is how the prize money is divided:

January

Challenge Tour 1
Challenge Tour 1 was contested on Saturday 25 January 2020 at the Robin Park Tennis Centre in Wigan.

Challenge Tour 2
Challenge Tour 2 was contested on Saturday 25 January 2020 at the Robin Park Tennis Centre in Wigan.

Challenge Tour 3
Challenge Tour 3 was contested on Sunday 26 January 2020 at the Robin Park Tennis Centre in Wigan.

Challenge Tour 4
Challenge Tour 4 was contested on Sunday 26 January 2020 at the Robin Park Tennis Centre in Wigan.

October

Challenge Tour 5
Challenge Tour 5 was contested on Friday 9 October 2020 at the Barnsley Metrodome in Barnsley.

Challenge Tour 6
Challenge Tour 6 was contested on Friday 9 October 2020 at the Barnsley Metrodome in Barnsley.

Challenge Tour 7
Challenge Tour 7 was contested on Saturday 10 October 2020 at the Barnsley Metrodome in Barnsley.

Challenge Tour 8
Challenge Tour 8 was contested on Saturday 10 October 2020 at the Barnsley Metrodome in Barnsley.

Challenge Tour 9
Challenge Tour 9 was contested on Sunday 11 October 2020 at the Barnsley Metrodome in Barnsley.

Challenge Tour 10
Challenge Tour 10 was contested on Sunday 11 October 2020 at the Barnsley Metrodome in Barnsley.

References

2020 in darts
2020 PDC Pro Tour